An hour is a unit of measurement of time. 

(The) Hour(s) may also refer to:

Time
 Canonical hours or liturgical hours, divisions of the day in Christianity
 Book of Hours, a printed book or often a manuscript containing prayers for such hours (e.g., the "Hours of Catherine of Cleves")  
 Horae (Hours), deities in Greek mythology
 Carnegie Unit and Student Hour or credit-hours, a measurement of completed coursework at a college or university.

Art, entertainment, and media
 The Hours (engraving), by Francesco Bartolozzi, based on a painting by Maria Cosway

Literature
 The Hours (novel), a 1998 novel by Michael Cunningham
 Mrs Dalloway, a novel by Virginia Woolf that had the working title "The Hours"

Periodicals
 The Hour (newspaper), a daily newspaper by in Norwalk, Connecticut, U.S.
 Hour Community, a weekly entertainment newspaper published in Montreal, earlier known as Hour

Television
 Hour Magazine, a 1980–1988 syndicated talk show hosted by Gary Collins
 The Hour (2009 TV programme), a 2009–2011 Scottish early evening lifestyle television programme, broadcast on STV
 The Hour (2011 TV series), a 2011–2012 British television drama series set in 1956 that aired on BBC
 George Stroumboulopoulos Tonight, a 2005–2014 Canadian late-night talk show known from 2005 to 2010 as The Hour

Films
 The Hours (film), a 2002 drama film directed by Stephen Daldry
 Hours (2013 film), a 2013 thriller film

Music
 The Hours (band)
 Hours (David Bowie album), a 1999 album by British musician David Bowie
 Hours (Funeral for a Friend album), a 2005 album by Welsh rock band Funeral for a Friend
 The Hours (soundtrack), the soundtrack composed by Philip Glass to the film of the same name
 "Hours", a song by TV on the Radio from the album Return to Cookie Mountain
 "The Hours", a song by Handsome Boy Modeling School from the album White People
 The Hours (opera), 2022 opera by Kevin Puts

Places
 Hours, Pyrénées-Atlantiques, a commune in France
 Hour, a part of the Walloon municipality of Houyet in Belgium

Other uses
 Right ascension, the astronomical unit of measure of angle
 Hour record, the hour-long bicycle race
 Day of Resurrection, the Day of Judgement in Islam, also known as "The Hour"